The Chi Omega Greek Theatre is a structure on the University of Arkansas campus in Fayetteville, Arkansas. It was a gift to the university from Chi Omega, and it was completed in 1930. The structure was added to the National Register of Historic Places in 1992.

Construction
Mary Love Collins, national president for 42 years, and Dr. Charles Richardson, one of the founding members of the Chi Omega women's fraternity, had the dream of one day building a replica of the Theatre of Dionysus at the foot of the Acropolis in Greece at the University of Arkansas. The first chapter (Psi) of Chi Omega was established at the University in 1895, and the national organization gave back to the University in 1930 by completing Love and Richardson's dream. Young-Bryan Construction Company was contracted in 1930 for the job, at a cost of $31,225. University president John C. Futrall accepted the gift on June 28, 1930.

Uses
The University uses the Chi Omega Greek Theatre for concerts, commencements, convocations, plays, and pep rallies.

During World War II, a crowd of over 6,000 gathered to watch the Army Air Corps Band. This is believed to be the largest crowd in the theatre's history.

See also
National Register of Historic Places listings in Washington County, Arkansas

References

External links

 University of Arkansas

University of Arkansas buildings
Theatres on the National Register of Historic Places in Arkansas
Theatres completed in 1930
National Register of Historic Places in Fayetteville, Arkansas
University and college buildings completed in 1930
1930 establishments in Arkansas